The Picton Reading Room and Hornby Library are two grade II* listed buildings on William Brown Street, Liverpool, England, which now form part of the Liverpool Central Library.

The chairman of the William Brown Library and Museum, Sir James Picton, laid the foundation stone of the Picton Reading Room in 1875. It was designed by Cornelius Sherlock, and modelled after the British Museum Reading Room, and was the first electrically lit library in the UK. It was completed in 1879 formally opened by the Mayor of Liverpool, Sir Thomas Bland Royden. The front is semicircular with Corinthian columns, and the shape was chosen by the architect to cover the change in the axis of the row of buildings at this point. The Hornby Reading Room (named after Hugh Frederick Hornby) by Thomas Shelmerdine was added in 1906. It stands behind the older building and the interior is decorated in the Edwardian Imperial style.

Gallery

Picton Reading Room

Hornby Library

See also
Architecture of Liverpool

References

External links
William Brown Library and Museum
Images of England:Picton Reading Room and Hornby Library

Public libraries in Merseyside
Grade II* listed buildings in Liverpool
Grade II* listed library buildings
Library buildings completed in 1879
Library buildings completed in 1906
Libraries in Liverpool
1879 establishments in England